This page lists substances used in ritualistic context.

Psychoactive use

Entheogens
This is a list of species and genera that are used as entheogens or are used in an entheogenic concoction (such as ayahuasca). For ritualistic use they may be classified as hallucinogens. The active principles and historical significance of each are also listed to illustrate the requirements necessary to be categorized as an entheogen. The psychoactive substances are usually classified as soft drugs in terms of drug harmfulness.

Animal

Mushroom

Plant

Chemicals
Many man-made chemicals with little human history have been recognized to catalyze intense spiritual experiences, and many synthetic entheogens are simply slight modifications of their naturally occurring counterparts. Some synthetic substances like 4-AcO-DMT are prodrugs that metabolize into psychoactive substances that have been used as entheogens. While synthetic DMT and mescaline are reported to have identical entheogenic qualities as extracted or plant-based sources, the experience may wildly vary due to the lack of numerous psychoactive alkaloids that constitute the material. This is similar to how isolated THC produces very different effects than an extract that retains the many cannabinoids of the plant such as cannabidiol and cannabinol. A pharmaceutical version of the entheogenic brew ayahuasca is called Pharmahuasca.

Prodrugs

This page lists non-psychedelic psychoactive substances which are consumed in ritual contexts for their consciousness-altering effects. Non-psychoactive consumption like symbolic ingestion of psychoactive substances is not mentioned here.

Non-psychedelic substances used in rituals
This is a list of psychoactive substances which are consumed in ritual contexts for their consciousness-altering effects. Some of these drugs are classified as hard drugs in terms of drug harmfulness.

Animal

Plant
The plant parts are listed to prevent accidents. For example, kava roots should always be used because the leaves of the plant are known to cause hepatoxicity and death.

Chemicals

Poly drug use of non-psychedelics and entheogens used in rituals

Sober use

Disclaimer: Salvia apiana and Bursera fagaroides do not contain any psychoactive substances at all, they are solely used for ritualistic purpose while Aztec tobacco, Morning glories, and Syrian rue (all listed in the #Psychoactive_use table), and Cacao Beans (mild) are psychoactive when consumed.

Flora

See also
 Entheogen
 Entheogenic drugs and the archaeological record
 Ethnobotany
 God in a Pill?
 List of Acacia species known to contain psychoactive alkaloids
 List of plants used for smoking
 N,N-Dimethyltryptamine
 Psilocybin mushrooms
 Psychoactive cacti
 Psychoactive plant

References

 
Biological sources of psychoactive drugs
Hallucinations
Rituals
Comparison of psychoactive substances